A by-election was held for the New South Wales Legislative Assembly electorate of Lismore on 12 September 1959 because Justice Sugerman in the Court of Disputed Returns declared that the 1959 Lismore election was void. Electoral officers failed to initial or sign 51 ballot papers, rendering those papers informal. Those electors had been prevented from casting an effective vote and therefore preventing from voting. As Jack Easter's margin at the election was only 2 votes, the errors may have affected the result of the election.

Dates

Candidates
 Clyde Campbell, was an independent candidate at the 1959 election but was endorsed by the Country Party for the by-election
 Jack Easter was the sitting member and retained Country Party endorsement. He had been elected with 63% of the two-party-preferred result at the 1953 Lismore election, increasing to 68% at the 1956 Lismore election.
 Keith Compton was the  candidate. There had been no Labor candidate at the election in March.

Result

	

	

The 1959 Lismore election was declared void.

See also
Electoral results for the district of Lismore
List of New South Wales state by-elections

References

1959 elections in Australia
New South Wales state by-elections
1950s in New South Wales